Kowloon Station is one of the 20 constituencies in the Yau Tsim Mong District.

Created for the 2019 District Council elections, the constituency returns one district councillor to the Yau Tsim Mong District Council, with an election every four years.

Kowloon Station loosely covers the private flats surrounding the Kowloon MTR station, including Sorrento, The Arch, The Cullinan, The Harbourside and The Waterfront. It has projected population of 17,591.

Councillors represented

Election results

2010s

References

West Kowloon
Constituencies of Hong Kong
Constituencies of Yau Tsim Mong District Council
2019 establishments in Hong Kong
Constituencies established in 2019